Martin Hess may refer to:
 Martin Hess (footballer), German footballer
 Martin Hess (politician), German politician